Government Superior Science College Peshawar is a public sector college located in Wazir Bagh Peshawar, Khyber Pakhtunkhwa, Pakistan. The college offers programs for intermediate and degree levels in Science and Arts groups. The college is affiliated for its degree programs with University of Peshawar.

Overview & history 
Government Superior Science College (GSSC) Peshawar Pakistan is one of most popular public sector colleges operating within Peshawar metropolitan along with Government College Peshawar and Government College Hayatabad, Peshawar. It was established in 1962 and provides educational services along with training in sports and other social skills. The college shifted to its current campus in 1972 besides famous and historice Wazir Bagh. The college is well connected through the roads with the surrounding areas and other parts of Peshawar city.

Vision 
The vision of college is to broaden the horizons of knowledge and enable students to reach the zenith of intellectual achievement and personal growth to the ultimate benefit of human society and beyond.

Academic programs 
The college currently offers the following programs.

Intermediate 
 FSc – Pre-Medical (2 years)
 FSc – Pre-Engineering (2 years)
 FSc – Computer Science (2 years)
 FA – General Science (2 years)
 FA – Humanities (2 years)

Degrees (2 Years) 
 BA - Humanities (2 years) 
 BSc - General and Computer Sciences (2 years)

BS Degrees (4 Years) 
 BS - 4 Years programme (14 Discipline)

Departments And Faculties 
The college currently has the following departments and faculties.

Faculty of Social Sciences/Humanities 
 Department of Archaeology
 Department of Economics
 Department of English
 Department of Geography
 Department of History
 Department of Islamic Studies
 Department of Law
 Department of Library Science
 Department of Pakistan Study
 Department of Pashto
 Department of Physical Education
 Department of Political Science
 Department of Urdu

Faculty of Physical Sciences 
 Department of Chemistry
 Department of Computer Science
 Department of Mathematics
 Department of Physics
 Department of Statistics

Faculty of Biological Sciences 
 Department of Botany
 Department of Zoology

See also 
 Edwardes College Peshawar
 Islamia College Peshawar
 Government College Peshawar
 Government Superior Science College Peshawar
 Government College Hayatabad Peshawar
 Government Degree College Naguman Peshawar
 Government Degree College Mathra Peshawar
 Government Degree College Badaber Peshawar
 Government Degree College Chagarmatti Peshawar
 Government Degree College Wadpagga Peshawar
 Government Degree College Achyni Payan Peshawar

External links 
 Government Superior Science College Peshawar Official Website

References

Colleges in Peshawar
Universities and colleges in Peshawar
Educational institutions established in 1962
1962 establishments in Pakistan